Akritas Chlorakas is a Cypriot football club based in Chloraka, Paphos. The club was founded in 1971, and currently plays in the Cypriot First Division. Akritas' colours are green and white, and they play their home games at the Chloraka Municipal Stadium.

History
Founded in 1971, Akritas Chlorakas joined the Cyprus Football Association in 1973, competing in the Cypriot Third Division. For many years, Akritas fluctuated between the Second and Third Division, winning the Third Division a total of three times, and winning the Cypriot Cup for Lower Divisions on one occasion. 

Akritas Chlorakas finished third in the 2021-22 Cypriot Second Division, and was promoted to the First Division for the first time in the club's history.

Current squad

Out on loan

For recent transfers, see List of Cypriot football transfers summer 2022

Club officials

Board of directors

Technical and medical staff

General Manager: Nikolas Liasides

Achievements
Cypriot Third Division
 Winners (3): 1976-77, 2008-09, 2015–16
Cypriot Cup for Lower Divisions
 Winners (1): 2014-15

References 

Football clubs in Cyprus
Association football clubs established in 1971
1971 establishments in Cyprus